Vladislav Yuryevich Frolov (born 24 July 1980 in Tambov) is a Russian sprint athlete.

He won the silver medal in the 400 metres at the 2006 European Athletics Championships in Gothenburg, running a personal best of 45.09 s.

At the 2007 European Indoor Athletics Championships he won a silver medal in the 4 x 400 metres relay, with teammates Ivan Buzolin, Maksim Dyldin and Artem Sergeyenkov. The Russian team originally finished third, after Russia's anchor runner Sergeyenkov was pushed by Germany's Bastian Swillims when the latter advanced past Sergeyenkov on the last lap. However, the incident resulted in the disqualification of the victorious German team and the subsequent promotion of Russia to second place.

Frolov was part of the team that finished third in Men's 4x400 m relay at the 2008 Summer Olympics, but the team was disqualified after team mate Denis Alekseyev tested positive for doping.

References
 
 

1980 births
Living people
Sportspeople from Tambov
Russian male sprinters
Olympic male sprinters
Olympic athletes of Russia
Athletes (track and field) at the 2008 Summer Olympics
Competitors stripped of Summer Olympics medals
Universiade medalists in athletics (track and field)
Universiade bronze medalists for Russia
Medalists at the 2005 Summer Universiade
World Athletics Championships athletes for Russia
European Athletics Championships medalists
Russian Athletics Championships winners